Köprübaşı is a town and district of Manisa Province in the Aegean region of Turkey. According to the 2000 census, population of the district is 10,851 of which 5,049 live in the town of Köprübaşı.

Notes

References

External links 
 District governor's official website 
 Road map of Köprübaşı and environs

Populated places in Manisa Province
Districts of Manisa Province